BJA may refer to:
Billie Joe Armstrong (born 1972), American musician, frontman of the band Green Day
British Journal of Anaesthesia
British Judo Association
Bureau of Justice Assistance, located under the U.S. Department of Justice (DOJ)